Dixieland Jazz was a Canadian music television series which aired on CBC Television in 1954.

Premise
The series host was Trump Davidson, a cornet player. He also hosted a radio music series on CBC's Trans-Canada Network.

Scheduling
This half-hour series was broadcast at various days and times from 21 April 1954 to 6 September 1954.

References

External links
 

CBC Television original programming
1950s Canadian music television series
1954 Canadian television series debuts
1954 Canadian television series endings
Black-and-white Canadian television shows